Australia: Sound of the Earth is a 1991 album from Steve Roach, documenting Roach's second trip to Australia. David Hudson's didgeridoo and cellist Sarah Hopkins were also featured.

Track listing
”Red Dust and Sweat” - 10:46
”Call to Kuranda” - 3:15
”The Ancient Voice” - 3:10
”Atmosphere for Dreaming” - 7:52
”Darktime - The Initiation” - 7:13
”Origin” - 4:48
”Spirits” -3:20
”The Hunter” - 3:03
”Awakening Earth” - 14:10
”Land Sound - The Dreaming Place” - 5:14

References

1990 albums
Steve Roach (musician) albums